= Pump Station 3 Airport =

- IATA: none; ICAO: OEPC

Summary
- Airport type: Private
- Owner: Saudi Aramco
- Operator: Saudi Aramco
- Serves: Pump Station 3
- Location: Pump Station 3
- Elevation AMSL: 1,739 ft / 530 m
- Coordinates: 25.1748°N 47.4887°E
- Interactive map of Pump Station 3 Airport

Runways
Direction	Length		Surface
Direction	ft	m	Surface
16/34	7,972	2,430	Asphalt

Pump Station 3 Airport is a small airport in the oil complex of Pump Station 3 in the Eastern Province of Saudi Arabia. The airport occupies an area of 1.1 km^{2} next to the complex.

== Overview ==
Saudi Aramco, the national oil company of Saudi Arabia, owns and operate the airport providing logistic support to the remote oil complex. Using Boeing 737 and Dash 8 aircraft, the company operates scheduled flights to Dammam for the headquarters in Dhahran.

== Facilities ==
The airport is equipped with one runway, 2,430 meters long and 30 meters wide. Only one parking/gate can be found there.
